The British Rail Class 220 Voyager is a class of diesel-electric high-speed multiple unit passenger trains built in Belgium by Bombardier Transportation in 2000 and 2001. They were introduced in 2001 to replace the 20-year-old InterCity 125 and almost 40-year-old Class 47-hauled Mark 2 fleets operating on the Cross Country Route. They were initially operated by Virgin CrossCountry and since 2007 have been operated by CrossCountry.

Technical details

These power a generator which supplies current to motors driving two axles per coach, with one axle per bogie powered.

Voyagers have both air and rheostatic brakes. They are fitted with Dellner couplers, like the Class 222 operated by East Midlands Railway and the Class 390 Pendolino electric trains used by Avanti West Coast, meaning they can be coupled in rescue/recovery mode (air brake only) in the event of a failure. 220s and 221s can also be easily assisted by Dellner fitted Class 57s (Thunderbirds) in the event of a failure. By use of adaptor couplings a failed 220 or 221 can also be assisted by any air braked locomotive such as a Class 37, Class 47 or Class 66 or even an HST. 

The Class 220s and closely related Class 222s have B5005 bogies, which are distinctive as they are of inside-frame design and so the axles are supported by bearings behind the wheels, meaning the outside face of the wheel is visible. The related tilting Class 221 Super Voyager has outside-frame bogies and hence a more conventional appearance.

Their route availability is very good being RA 2 - in part due to the lightweight bogie design.

Class 220 units are fitted with an AB Hoses variable rate sanding system.

All Voyagers are maintained at the dedicated Central Rivers TMD near Burton-on-Trent.

Accidents and incidents
Units have sometimes been stopped by salt water, when storm-driven waves broke over the train at Dawlish in south Devon and inundated the resistor banks, causing the control software to shut down. This problem was fixed by an upgrade to the control software.

There were a number of exhaust fires on the Voyager class during 2005–2006 due to incorrect fitting of equipment during overhauls. Fires occurred at Starcross (Class 221), Newcastle, and on 19 January 2006 at Congleton.

On 26 May 2006, a passenger was murdered aboard unit 220005 as it approached Oxenholme whilst working the Glasgow to Paignton service.

This fire was caused by a bird getting caught under one of the hot brake resistors on the roof of the train. Damage to the train was not serious and it was repaired and returned to service.

Formation and passenger facilities

Class 220s operate in four-coach sets. These trains, unlike the older trains they replaced, feature electronic information displays on the exterior walls showing the train number, the departure time, the coach, the train's destination, and the next station. They are air-conditioned throughout, with powered doors. The coaches are fitted with power sockets for laptop computers and mobile phone charging. Toilet facilities for disabled people and storage facilities for bicycles are provided.

They provide 26 seats in 2+1 formation in first class and 174 seats in 2+2 formation in standard class.

The formation of a four-car Class 220 is as follows:
 604XX - Coach A - 26 seats - First class with disabled area, train manager office, first class catering area, and driving cab. Toilet.
 602XX - Coach C - 66 seats - Standard class. Toilet.
 607XX - Coach D - 66 seats - Standard class with large luggage area and reservable space for three bikes. No toilet.
 603XX - Coach F - 42 seats - Standard class with disabled area, catering base, and driving cab. Toilet.

There is no coach B on the four-car class 220; it exists on the five-car Class 221 and is usually a coach which holds no reservations. This aids short-term fleet changes, for example if a Class 220 is running in a diagram that usually has a Class 221, then the loss of a coach will not affect the reservation system, as they will all still be allocated.

CrossCountry has finished updating the interior layout of all its 220 and 221 sets. The interior renovation involved the removal of the shop from coach D and the conversion of the stowage area in coach F to a catering storage area where there is now a fridge, food storage, and a space for an on-board trolley to be stored. Bicycle storage has been moved to coach D where the shop was. It can now store three bicycles instead of four. The aim is to increase seating capacity, in line with its commitments to the franchise agreements, as well as to provide an at-seat trolley service for refreshments instead of a shop. Research had shown that the shop was not making as good a turnover as hoped because people prefer not to leave their seats to get refreshments; they feared either losing their seat or having their belongings stolen when away.

Operations

All units are owned by Beacon Rail, after they were purchased from Voyager Rail Leasing, a consortium of Lloyds Banking Group and Angel Trains.

Virgin CrossCountry was the sole operator of Class 220 Voyager trains when they were introduced in 2001. When the Cross Country Route franchise was transferred to Arriva CrossCountry in November 2007, most of the Voyager fleet was transferred with it, and by the end of 2007 CrossCountry was the sole operator of Class 220 units.

Class 220 units often operate in multiple with  units, which are mechanically similar except for their bogies and have the same coupler type.

Fleet details

Named units
Some units have been named; these are as follows:

On 27 July 2021, 220016 was named Voyager 20 at Central Rivers to mark two decades of fleet use.

On 19 August 2021, 220009 was named Hixon at Stafford railway station to commemorate the 11 lives lost and 45 Injured in the Hixon rail crash of January 1968.

See also 

 List of high speed trains

References

Further reading

External links 

Diesel Electric Multiple Unit, Class 220 "Voyager" - United Kingdom Bombardier Class 220 page
 Testing the Class 220s

Virgin Trains
220
Bombardier Transportation multiple units
Passenger trains running at least at 200 km/h in commercial operations
Passenger trains running at least at 200 km/h in commercial operations
Articles containing video clips
Train-related introductions in 2001